Gaucha is a genus of Mummuciid camel spiders, first described by Cândido Mello-Leitão in 1924.

Species 
, the World Solifugae Catalog accepts the following seven species:

 Gaucha avexada Botero-Trujillo, Ott & Carvalho, 2017 — Brazil
 Gaucha casuhati Botero-Trujillo, Ott & Carvalho, 2017 — Argentina
 Gaucha curupi Botero-Trujillo, Ott & Carvalho, 2017 — Brazil
 Gaucha eremolembra Botero-Trujillo, Ott & Carvalho, 2017 — Brazil
 Gaucha fasciata Mello-Leitão, 1924 — Argentina, Brazil, Uruguay
 Gaucha ramirezi Botero-Trujillo, Ott, Mattoni, Nime & Ojanguren-Affilastro, 2019 — Argentina
 Gaucha santana Botero-Trujillo, Ott, Mattoni, Nime & Ojanguren-Affilastro, 2019 — Brazil

References 

Solifugae genera
Solifugae
Taxa named by Cândido Firmino de Mello-Leitão
Taxa described in 1924